Richard Hurst is a British writer and director.

Richard Hurst or Herst may also refer to:

Richard Hurst (MP) for Melcombe Regis
Richard Hurst (actor) (died 1805), British stage actor
Richard Hurst (cricketer), English cricketer
Rick Hurst (Richard Hurst, born 1946), American actor
Richard Hurst (acrobatic gymnast) in 2012 Acrobatic Gymnastics World Championships
Richard Hurst, character in The Rat Catchers
Richard Herst (died 1628), English Catholic martyr